The Men's 200m T52 had its Final held on September 10 at 17:15.

Medalists

Results

References
Final

Athletics at the 2008 Summer Paralympics